Acartia tranteri is a species of marine copepod belonging to the family Acartiidae. This Australian species is related to the New Zealand species A. ensifera, A. jilletti and A. simplex but can be distinguished by the lack of any ventral prominence posterior to the genital opening in the female and the presence of posterior spines on the metasome (body segment) of the male. It is found off the southern coast of Australia (New South Wales).

References

Acartia tranteri at World of Copepods

Calanoida
Crustaceans described in 1976